Road to the Stage is a 1963 Armenian film about a young circus artist (Leonid Yengibarov) who becomes a famous star.

The circus troupe of Armenian SSR took part in the shoot.

References

External links

Soviet-era Armenian films
Armenfilm films
1963 comedy films
1963 films
Soviet comedy films
Films directed by Henrik Malyan
Armenian comedy films